What's Words Worth? is the second live album by the band Motörhead, recorded on 18 February 1978, but not released until 1983 on Big Beat Records, some five years later. It is a collection of songs they played in the mid-late 70s; pretty much none of this material has been part of their live set since the early-mid 80s.

Background
Wilko Johnson organised a charity event on 18 February 1978, at The Roundhouse in London, to raise money for the preservation of William Wordsworth manuscripts. Motörhead & Chiswick Records labelmates The Count Bishops, plus Wilko Johnson, were on the bill, but for contractual reasons Motörhead needed to perform under the name Iron Fist and the Hordes from Hell, part of which would later be used for the name of a studio album, Iron Fist. During this performance Mick Farren joined them on-stage for a rendition of "Lost Johnny", which wasn't included in the album and still hasn't been released. The Rolling Stones Mobile recording studio had been hired to record the 'Bishops live for an upcoming LP, and Motörhead manager at the time Tony Secunda asked if they could record his band also. Following issues with Secunda shortly after this gig, the band changed managers back to Doug Smith, though Secunda had been given a copy of the concert after the show. Secunda left England and returned to the USA not long after this, but the master tape had been kept by Chiswick. As money was always an issue with the band in these days, Smith remembered the tapes and a deal was done to release the recordings (partly) in 1983. As Ted Carroll states in the liner notes: 

Lemmy is heard at the end of the concert to say "read plenty of Wordsworth" and as a result the album got its title because of this.

Release
Chiswick Records boss Ted Carroll organised the Rolling Stones mobile truck to record the event, and later released the album through his Big Beat Records label in 1983 (NED 2). Since then it has been re-released with other titles and/or other sleeves, among others as "The Watcher" in Canada, "City Kids," "Live, Loud and Lewd" and "Iron Fist and the Hordes from Hell." In 2017, this concert was re-released on 3-LP box set of Motörhead's debut album, specially for Record Store Day.

Track listing

Personnel

 Lemmy Kilmister – lead vocals, bass
 "Fast" Eddie Clarke – guitar, backing vocals
 Phil "Philthy Animal" Taylor – drums

Production

 Production & Mastering – Duncan Cowell at Sound Mastering Ltd

References

External links

Motörhead live albums
1983 live albums
Live heavy metal albums